The 2016–17 FC Dinamo București season is the 68th consecutive edition of competitive football by FC Dinamo București's in Liga I. Dinamo won Cupa Ligii for the first time in history.

Players

Squad changes

Transfers in:

Transfers out:

Loans in

Loans out

Squad statistics

Statistics accurate as of match played 20 March 2016

Competitions

Liga I

Regular season

Table

Championship round

Table

Competitive

Liga I

Results

Cupa Ligii final

References

External links
soccerway
lpf.ro
romaniansoccer.ro

2016-17
Dinamo București